
Gmina Sanok is a rural gmina (administrative district) in Sanok County, Subcarpathian Voivodeship, in south-eastern Poland. Its seat is the town of Sanok, although the town is not part of the territory of the gmina.

The gmina contains part of the protected area called Słonne Mountains Landscape Park.

Villages
Gmina Sanok contains the villages and settlements of Bykowce, Czerteż, Dębna, Dobra, Falejówka, Hłomcza, Jędruszkowce, Jurowce, Kostarowce, Lalin, Liszna, Łodzina, Markowce, Międzybrodzie, Mrzygłód , Niebieszczany, Pakoszówka, Pisarowce, Płowce, Prusiek, Raczkowa, Sanoczek, Srogów Dolny, Srogów Górny, Strachocina, Stróże Małe, Stróże Wielkie, Trepcza, Tyrawa Solna, Wujskie, Zabłotce and Załuż.

Neighbouring gminas
Gmina Sanok is bordered by the gminas of Bircza, Brzozów, Bukowsko, Dydnia, Lesko, Tyrawa Wołoska, Zagórz and Zarszyn.

References
Polish official population figures 2006

Rural landscape picture

Sanok
Sanok County